Peter Wilson (born 19 March 1960) is a Zimbabwean sailor. He competed in the Finn event at the 1980 Summer Olympics.

References

External links
 

1960 births
Living people
Zimbabwean male sailors (sport)
Olympic sailors of Zimbabwe
Sailors at the 1980 Summer Olympics – Finn
Place of birth missing (living people)